Meshack Odoom is a Ghanaian professional footballer who plays as midfielder for Ghana Premier League side Medeama S.C.

Career

Medeama SC 
Odoom joined the for Tarkwa-based side Medeama SC in 2017 and has been playing for the Mauve and Yellows since Ghana Premier League since 2017 Ghanaian Premier League season. He made his debut on 26 May 2017 playing the full 90 minutes in a 2–1 victory over Bolga Stars. He played 7 league matches at the end of the season.

During the 2018 Ghana Premier League season, he featured in just a league match, mostly an used substitute before the league was abandoned due to the dissolution of the Ghana Football Association (GFA) in June 2018, as a result of the Anas Number 12 Expose. In the 2019 GFA Normalization Committee Special Competition, he appeared on the bench for several matches but only featured in 5 matches as Medeama placed 3rd in group A. During the 2019–20 Ghana Premier League season, he still served in an auxiliary role appearing on the bench for 13 matches and playing 3 matches before the league was cancelled due to the outbreak of the COVID-19 pandemic.

References

External links 

 

Living people
Association football midfielders
Ghanaian footballers
Medeama SC players
Ghana Premier League players
Year of birth missing (living people)